Busem Şeker (born 19 July 1998) is a Turkish-German football midfielder currently playing in the Turkish Women's Football Super League for Fenerbahçe. She is a member of the Turkey women's national team.

Private life
Busem Şeker was born in Hamburg, Germany on 19 July 1998. She resides in Rothenburgsort, a borough of Hamburg. She is a high school student, and hopes to pass the Abitur at the end of the 2016/17 term. She also jobs in the hotel and restaurant business. She did a 'Freiwilliges Soziales Jahr' in 2017/18 in Hamburg.

Club career 
Şeker got interested in football playing already at the age of four. 
She began her playing career in the youth team of FTSV Lorbeer Rothenburgsort. There, she was the only girl among boys. She made it to become also captain of the youth team, at which she was respected by her male playmates. At the age of 17, she transferred to ASV Bergedorf 85. After one season, she signed with SV Henstedt-Ulzburg in the German 2nd Women's Football Bundesliga North.

She coached the "F-Jugend" team (age group 7–8 years old) of her initial club, at which still only boys play.

On 11 October 2018, she went to Turkey to play for the İzmir-based club Konak Belediyespor in the 2018–19 Women's First League. After playing one season, at which she scored five goals in 16 matches, she returned to Germany on 27 August 2019.

On 15 April 2021, she joined her former club Konak Belediyespor to play in the 2020-21 Turkish Women's Football League.  After two seasons and seven goals in 27 matches, she transferred to Fenerbahçe S.K. in Istanbuk on 10 October 2022 to play in the 2022-23 Women's Super League season.

International career 

Şeker was approached by Çağla Korkmaz, Turkish-German player of VfL Wolfsburg II, for joining the Turkey women's national team that she prompt accepted. She was admitted to the  national team, and debuted internationally in the Goldcity Women's Cup 2017 on 1 March 2017. She took part at the 2019 FIFA Women's World Cup qualification – UEFA preliminary round – Group 4 matches.

Career statistics
.

Honours 
 Turkish Women's First Football League
 Konak Belediyespor
 Third places (1): 2018–19

References

External links

1998 births
Living people
Footballers from Hamburg
German people of Turkish descent
Women's association football midfielders
German women's footballers
2. Frauen-Bundesliga players
Turkish women's footballers
Turkey women's international footballers
Turkish Women's Football Super League players
Konak Belediyespor players
Fenerbahçe S.K. women's football players